Parastenolechia acclivis is a moth of the family Gelechiidae. It is found in northern Vietnam.

References

Moths described in 1988
Parastenolechia